Corynanthe is a genus of flowering plants in the family Rubiaceae.

Species
, Plants of the World Online accepted the following species, including those formerly placed in the genus Pausinystalia.
Corynanthe brachythyrsus K.Schum.
Corynanthe johimbe K.Schum.
Corynanthe lane-poolei Hutch.
Corynanthe macroceras K.Schum.
Corynanthe mayumbensis (R.D.Good) N.Hallé
Corynanthe pachyceras K.Schum.
Corynanthe paniculata Welw.
Corynanthe talbotii (Wernham) Å.Krüger & Löfstrand

References

External links
 Kew World Checklist of Selected Plant Families, Corynanthe

Rubiaceae genera
Naucleeae
Flora of Africa